Chen Shi (born 6 July 1993) is a Chinese slalom canoeist who has competed at the international level since 2009. She is from Liaoning in north-east China. Shi mainly competes in C1, but has also competed in mixed C2 with Shu Jianming.

She won a gold medal in the C1 event at the 2018 Asian Games near Jakarta, and two gold medals at the 2017 Asian Canoe Slalom Championships in Nakhon Nayok. Shi's best senior world championship results are 19th (C1: 2018), 45th (K1: 2009) and 7th (Mixed C2: 2017).

Chen competed in the C1 event at the 2020 Summer Olympics in Tokyo, after China secured a quota place at the 2021 Asian Canoe Slalom Olympic Qualifiers in Pattaya. She finished in 17th place after being eliminated in the semifinal.

References

External links 
 

1993 births
Living people
Chinese female canoeists
Asian Games gold medalists for China
Canoeists at the 2014 Asian Games
Canoeists at the 2018 Asian Games
Asian Games medalists in canoeing
Medalists at the 2018 Asian Games
Canoeists at the 2020 Summer Olympics
Olympic canoeists of China
21st-century Chinese women